The Mourdi Depression is a prominent desert depression of northeastern Chad. It lies adjacent to the Ennedi Plateau. The cleft lies "between the Erdi plateau and the eastern slopes of Ennedi, and the mouth of the Wadi Guroguro."

Geography
The Mourdi Depression lies along a trading route from Abéché to Kurfa; this route passes Tiné, then veers north to Bao, before passing through the Mourdi Depression and Erdi Ma. The Mourdi Depression is also along a fisherman's route for reaching the northeast of Lake Chad by traveling through the Erdi Plateau and Ennedi gap via the depression. The Wadi N'kaola in situated within the Mourdi Depression, and the nearest major town is Fada to the southwest. Small barchans are noted here.

Culture
The depression is cited as one of the most important Saharan grazing-grounds. There are numerous rock paintings in the area. The depression was explored by R. A. Bagnold, a pioneer in desert explorations in 1932. During this first motorized expedition in 1932, he found implements on the northern scarp, dated to the Lower Palaeolithic and Middle Palaeolithic period in the valley. In the piste, next to the depression and in the northern rock formations of Ennedi, are rock arches; the Guela d'Archei and its colony of dwarf crocodiles are of particular note. Addax, a critically endangered species, is found in small numbers in this depression.

References

Bibliography
 
 

Geography of Chad
Depressions (geology)